The Promontory Mountains are a range in Box Elder County, Utah. The First transcontinental railroad was completed with the Golden Spike just north of the range at Promontory Summit in the Utah Territory. Today, trains cross the Promontory Point at the southern tip of the range via the Lucin Cutoff railroad causeway across the lake.

Geology
The Promontory Mountains are a block fault range typical of the Basin and Range Province. The west side of the range is bounded by the East Great Salt Lake normal fault which passes under the lake along the west side of Antelope Island and on to the south shore of the lake to the west side of the Oquirrh Mountains where it continues on strike as the Oquirrh Fault. The East Antelope Island fault runs from the east side of Antelope Island to the north beneath the lake to the east side of the Promentaries where it continues as the East Promontory Mountains fault zone. These two fault systems parallel the larger Wasatch Fault which runs to the east of Great Salt Lake. The faults are normal faults which dip to the west.

History

References

External links

Mountain ranges of Box Elder County, Utah
Mountain ranges of Utah